Glenn or Glen Phillips may refer to:

Glenn Phillips (guitarist), guitarist and composer
Glen Phillips (singer) (born 1970), singer and songwriter of Toad the Wet Sprocket
Glen Phillips (speedway rider) (born 1982), British speedway rider
Glenn Phillips (cricketer) (born 1996), New Zealand cricketer